Melaghar block is a developing block in Sepahijala district in the Indian state of Tripura, located about 50 km from the capital Agartala.

Villages in Sipahijala district